Philomena Begley (born 20 October 1942) is a country music singer from Northern Ireland. In 1975, Begley had a hit with her version of the Billie Jo Spears' song Blanket on the Ground reaching higher sales then Spears in both the UK and Ireland. In 2020, Begley became the first lady to be  inducted into ICMA Hall Of Fame. Today, Begley is affectionately known as 'The Queen of Country'.

Background
Philomena Begley was born and grew up in Pomeroy, County Tyrone, Northern Ireland, and worked in a hat factory in Cookstown before her break into music.

Career
Her first venture as a singer was with the popular Old Cross Céilí Band, with whom she sang as a dare, but stayed with the group. The group soon became known as the Old Cross Bandshow and released three records in Ireland in 1968 and 1969, but none made an impression in the chart. In September 1970, the band changed its name to The Country Flavour. Begley's first record following this became her first chart hit when "Here Today, Gone Tomorrow" reached number seven in the Irish chart. In 1974, she formed the Ramblin' Men, while the Country Flavour continued to tour with several other lead singers (including Eileen King and Dan O'Hara) during the 1970s.

Begley regularly toured with Ray Lynam from 1975 and they recorded many duets together, probably their most popular being "My Elusive Dreams", which went on to be mentioned in The Pogues' song, "A Pair of Brown Eyes".

In 1975, Begley had a hit with her version of Billie Jo Spears' hit song "Blanket on the Ground" which took her to number five in the Irish chart. Spears also released the song in the United Kingdom and in Ireland at the same time, but in Ireland, Begley's version received the highest sales, as Spears' version only went to number 11. Begley occasionally performed with Spears and later recorded a tribute song to her after the American star's death in 2011. 

By 1977, she was undertaking a major tour of the United States, and in 1978, she was invited to sing at the Grand Ole Opry by Porter Wagoner. Since then, she has returned annually to Nashville, been a guest of honour at the St. Patrick's Day parade in New York City, and has sung at both the Grand Ole Opry and Carnegie Hall.  Although few of Begley's CDs have been released in the United States, a number are available for downloading on the site Freegal Music.

Recognition
One of Begley's biggest fans is Irish singer Daniel O'Donnell, and he once said, "When Philomena sings a song you believe her... you feel that she's experienced every emotion she expresses."

Personal life
Philomena Begley is married to Tom Quinn and they have three children Mary, Aiden and Carol. She is also a grandmother. They reside on a farm in Galbally, County Tyrone. Her son Aiden Quinn has also established a singing career for himself. Her niece, Andrea Begley, won the BBC TV Series The Voice in June 2013.

She is a regular contributor to the Belfast Telegraph's Lifestyle section.

Discography
Albums
1972 - Truck Driving Woman (Release Records)
1973 - The Two of Us (with Ray Lynam) (Release)
1974 - Meet the Queen of Country Music (Top Spin Records)
1975 - The Best of Ray and Phil (with Ray Lynam) (Country Records)
1975 - Blanket on the Ground (Top Spin)
1976 - Irish Country Queen (Top Spin)
1976 - Queen of the Silver Dollar (Top Spin)
1977 - Truckin' Queen (Top Spin)
1978 - Nashville Country (Top Spin)
1979 - Fireside Country (Top Spin)
1979 - The Best of Philomena Begley (K-tel)
1980 - Philomena's Country (Top Spin)
1981 - My Kind of Country (Top Spin)
1983 - Country Scenes (K-tel)
1984 - You're in My Heart (Ritz Records)
1985 - Simply Divine (with Ray Lynam) (Ritz)
1987 - More About Love (Ritz)
1988 - Silver Anniversary Album (Ritz)
1991 - In Harmoney (Ritz)
1993 - Simply Divine (Ritz)
2002 - My Elusive Dreams (with Ray Lynam)(Prism Leisure Records)
2003 - Irlands Qeen 
2004 - Once Around the Dancefloor (Prism Leisure)
2005 - Village
2007 - The Philomena Begley Collection (Voice Records)
2009 - The Way Old Friends Do
2009 - I'll Only Give This Up When It Gives Me Up
2013 - How I Love Them Old Songs (H&H Records)
2018 - From Then Till Now (H&H)
2022 -  The Dimond Collection

References

1942 births
Living people
Country singers from Northern Ireland
Musicians from County Tyrone
20th-century women singers from Northern Ireland
21st-century women singers from Northern Ireland